Squabble may refer to:
Brouhaha or minor altercation
Controversy
Squabble Creek (Kentucky)
Squabble Creek (Texas)

See also
Upper Squabble, Kentucky